Leiogalathea is a genus of squat lobsters in the family Munidopsidae, containing the following species:
 Leiogalathea agassizii (A. Milne Edwards, 1880)
 Leiogalathea laevirostris (Balss, 1913)

References

Squat lobsters